John William Hurtle Coumbe  (28 September 1916 – 9 February 1983) was an Australian politician who represented the South Australian House of Assembly seat of Torrens from 1956 to 1977 for the Liberal and Country League and Liberal Party. On 26 September 1969, Coumbe laid the millionth brick of the Strathmont Centre in what is now Oakden.

References

 

Members of the South Australian House of Assembly
Liberal Party of Australia members of the Parliament of South Australia
1916 births
1983 deaths
Liberal and Country League politicians
20th-century Australian politicians
Members of the Order of Australia
Australian Army personnel of World War II
Australian Army soldiers